Aframomum kayserianum is a species of plant in the ginger family, Zingiberaceae. It was first described by Karl Moritz Schumann.

Range
Aframomum kayserianum is native to Cameroon and Nigeria.

References 

kayserianum